Allobates crombiei is a species of frog in the family Aromobatidae. It is endemic to the Pará state in Brazil.
Its natural habitats are tropical moist lowland forests, rivers, freshwater marshes, and intermittent freshwater marshes.
It is threatened by habitat loss and the Belo Monte Dam. It is named in honor of Ronald Ian Crombie.

References

crombiei
Endemic fauna of Brazil
Amphibians of Brazil
Frogs of South America
Amphibians described in 2002
Taxonomy articles created by Polbot